Grażyna is a Polish given name.

Grażyna may also refer to:

Grażyna, Masovian Voivodeship, a village in Poland
"Grażyna" (poem), an 1823 poem by Adam Mickiewicz
Grazyna Bluff, rock bluff in the south part of Turks Head Ridge, Ross Island, Antarctica